Tilson is a surname. Notable people with the surname include:

Charles Henry Tilson Marshall (1841–1927), British Army Officer, serving in the Punjab, India
Charles Tilson-Chowne (1881-?), British stage and film actor
Charlie Tilson (born 1992), American baseball player
David Tilson (born 1941), politician in Ontario, Canada
Fred Tilson (1904–1972), association football player for Manchester City and England
George Tilson (1672–1738), British civil servant, long-serving Under-Secretary of State in the Foreign Office
Jake Tilson (born 1958) British artist
Joe Tilson (artist) (born 1928) British artist
John Q. Tilson (1866–1958), Republican politician in the United States, on both state and national levels, and a lawyer
John Tilson (cricketer) (1845–1895), English cricketer who played for Derbyshire between 1871 and 1876
Michael Tilson Thomas (born 1944), American conductor, pianist and composer
Sumner Dewey Tilson (1898–1964), head coach of the Virginia Tech college football program during the 1942 season
Steve Tilson (born 1966), English football manager and former player
Tilson Brito (born 1972), Dominican third baseman
Tilson Pritchard (1872–1894), English footballer who played in the Football League for Small Heath
William Josiah Tilson (1871–1949), United States federal judge

See also
Red Tilson Trophy, annual award given to the most outstanding player in the Ontario Hockey League
Tilson's Manual, or A Manual of Parliamentary Procedure, a parliamentary authority written by John Q. Tilson and published in 1948